Sir John Eyles, 2nd Baronet (1683 – 11 March 1745) of Gidea Hall in Essex, was a British financier and politician who sat in the House of Commons from 1713 to 1734. He was Lord Mayor of London in 1726. He served as a Director of the East India Company 1710-14 and again 1717-21 and was appointed a sub-governor of the South Sea Company in 1721.

Origins
Eyles was the second but eldest surviving son of Sir Francis Eyles, 1st Baronet by his wife Elizabeth Ayley, a daughter Richard Ayley, a merchant in the City of London. His younger brother was Joseph Eyles, MP.

Career
Eyles was a Director of the East India Company from 1710 to 1714. He was elected as Whig Member of Parliament for Chippenham at the 1713 general election. From 1715 to 1717 he was a director of the Bank of England. He was elected MP for Chippenham again at the 1715 general election and voted consistently with the government.  He succeeded to his father's baronetcy on 24 May 1716 and became Master of the Haberdashers Company and Alderman of Vintry on 19 June 1716. Also in 1716, he was appointed one of the commissioners to oversee estates forfeited to the Crown during the unsuccessful Jacobite rising of 1715, a post he held until 1725.

From 1717 to 1721 Eyles served another term as Director of the East India Company. He was appointed Sheriff of London for 1720. He was also appointed a sub-governor of the South Sea Company in February 1721 in the aftermath of the South Sea Bubble. At the 1722 general election he was returned unopposed at Chippenham. He was knighted in December 1724 and served as Lord Mayor of London for the year 1726 to 1727. At the 1727 general election he was elected MP for the City of London.

At the 1734 general election Eyles did not stand for the City of London and was defeated at Chippenham. He became alderman for Bridge Without (a ward previously represented by his father) from 22 July 1737. He was also appointed president of St. Thomas's Hospital in 1737, and Joint Postmaster-General in 1739, holding both posts for the rest of his life.

Gidea Hall
Eyles purchased the estate of Gidea Hall, in Havering, demolished the old mansion there in 1720, and built a new "elegant" house.

In 1731, Eyles was the dedicatee of George Lillo's tragedy The London Merchant, a play later excerpted in French by Abbé Prévost who had served as Sir John's secretary and tutor to his son Francis.

Marriage and issue
He married Mary Haskin Styles (d.1735), the daughter of his first cousin Sarah Eyles (daughter of Sir John Eyles, elder brother of the first baronet.) by her husband Joseph Haskin Styles. Mary died on 14 November 1735, and was buried at St Helen's Bishopsgate 9 days later. By his wife he had issue one son and one daughter, including:
Sir Francis Haskins Eyles-Stiles, 3rd Baronet (d.1762), eldest son and heir.

Death
He died on 11 March 1745.

References

1683 births
1745 deaths
Members of the Parliament of Great Britain for English constituencies
Sheriffs of the City of London
18th-century lord mayors of London
Knights Bachelor
Baronets in the Baronetage of Great Britain
British MPs 1713–1715
British MPs 1715–1722
British MPs 1722–1727
British MPs 1727–1734
United Kingdom Postmasters General